Please Don't Date Him is a 2020 South Korean romantic comedy television series, starring Song Ha-yoon, Lee Jun-young, Yoon Bo-mi and Gong Min-jung. Directed by Oh Mi-kyeong, the story of this series revolves around Seo Ji-seong (Song Ha-yoon) a household appliances developer who dreams to live a life like a well-designed algorithm. The series was premiered on MBC Every 1 on November 10, 2020 and aired on every Tuesday at 22:40 (KST) till January 12, 2021.

Synopsis
An AI controlled, household appliances developer in Pelican Electronics, Seo Ji-seong, has dreams to live a perfect life like a well developed program.

Working on an Artificial Intelligence refrigerator with voice activated features, she inserts a super sensor chip which was lost by National Intelligence Service into a refrigerator and an  "Ancestral Spirit" program that picks scums instead of telling the freshness of vegetables is developed. So, Ji-seong finds out that her deemed perfect fiancé Jeong-han was actually not her Prince Charming.

One day, Jung Kook-hee, a firefighter, with no social media record, whom the program couldn't analyze, shows up. Ji-seong is skeptical about him, as there is no trace of his past on the internet.

Cast

Main
 Song Ha-yoon as Seo Ji-seong, Manager of Pelican Electronics 'Voice Recognition Smart Home Appliance Ubiquitous Innovation Development Team' a programmer of the AI controlled home appliances.
 Lee Jun-young as Jung Kook-hee, Whale Fire Station Life Safety Rescue Team Firefighter for 3 years, no social media, no digital convenience.
 Yoon Bo-mi as Moon Ye-seul, Seo Ji-seong's friend, Pelican quarantine staff.
 Gong Min-jeung as Tak Ki-hyun, owner of organic cafe near Pelican Electronics

Supporting
 Pelican Electronics
 Kang Mal-geum as Hwang Ga-eul, telegram girl, Pelican Electronics secretive girl
 Jeong Min-sung as Oh Byung-Gil
 Kim Ki-ri, as Jegal Su-won, team manager always raises ideological problems
 Nam Min-woo as Ok Dong-jin, an employee of the development team, coding man
 Kim Hyun-myung as Cho Yong-hwan, no one knows when he goes to work and when he leaves. 
 Park Han-sol as Byun Ha-ri, a subjective intern who takes care of what he did not do.

Dentist friends
 Lee Si-hoon as Bang Jeong-han, the man likes facebook, Dentist. Ex-boyfriend of Seo Ji-seong.
 Joo Woo-jae as Han Yu-jin, an Instagram-like man, dentist.

Tak Ki-hyun's husband
 Kim Tae-gyeom as Kim Sang-sik, Tak Ki-hyun's husband, old blogging man, an office worker.

Whale Fire Station
 Kim Gyeong-il as Gam Oh Joong, the man likes tinder, from Whale Fire Station, has three children but always needs love, finds that love outside.

Others
 Lee Ji-ha as Jung-han's mother
 Shin Ji-yeon as Nurse
 Jung In-gi
 Hwang Young-hee as Lee Eun-hwa
 Choi Baek-gu as Kim Jin-soo

Voice appearance
 Kim Myung-jun
 Kim Su-ji

Guest appearance
 Jo Jae-yoon

Production

Casting
In June 2020, Song Ha-yoon was cast for her comeback series. Lee Jun-young was cast as the main male lead of the series in the same month. Later in October, Yoon Bo-mi and Gong Min-jung were cast to play supporting roles.

Filming
Script reading was done in October 2020 as new stills were released. The first teaser was released in the last week of October 2020.

Original soundtrack

Part 1

Part 2

Part 3

Part 4

Part 5

Part 6

Part 7

Part 8

Part 9

Part 10

Ratings

References

External links
 
 
 Please Don't Date Him at Daum 

MBC TV television dramas
Korean-language television shows
2020 South Korean television series debuts
South Korean romantic comedy television series
South Korean science fiction television series
2021 South Korean television series endings